Alexander Konstantinovich Pashkov (born August 28, 1944 in Moscow, Soviet Union) is a retired ice hockey player who played in the Soviet Hockey League. He played for HC Dynamo Moscow, HC Lokomotiv Moscow, HC CSKA Moscow, and Krylya Sovetov Moscow. He was inducted into the Russian and Soviet Hockey Hall of Fame in 1978. He is a recipient of the Medal "For Labour Valour".

External links
 Russian and Soviet Hockey Hall of Fame bio

1944 births
Living people
HC CSKA Moscow players
HC Dynamo Moscow players
Ice hockey people from Moscow
Olympic medalists in ice hockey
Olympic ice hockey players of the Soviet Union
Ice hockey players at the 1972 Winter Olympics
Medalists at the 1972 Winter Olympics
Olympic gold medalists for the Soviet Union